Saul Lowenstam (1717 – 19 June 1790) was a renowned Dutch rabbi and talmudist.

Saul Lowenstam was born in 1717 in Rzeszów to his parents Aryeh Leib ben Saul (who was the rabbi in Rzeszów at the time) and Miriam the daughter of the Chacham Tzvi. He married Hendele, the daughter of Abraham Kahana, who was rabbi of Grodno, Ukraine. His first rabbinical position was in Lokachi, Ukraine (located in the Lokachi Raion and named Lakacz in Yiddish), followed by Dubno, where he succeeded his father-in-law.

After the death of his father in 1755, Lowenstam succeeded him as the Chief Rabbi of Amsterdam, Netherlands.
Lowenstam died in Amsterdam on 19 June 1790. He was succeeded as Chief Rabbi by his son, Jacob Moses Lowenstam.

Works
Lowenstam was the author of the Binyan Ariel published in Amsterdam 1778. He also authored a Torah Commentary HeChatzer HaChadasha published in Amsterdam in 1768. A pamphlet titled Halacha Lema'aseh Rav published in Amsterdam in 1828 contains his 1783 halachic ruling asserting the kashrut of Dutch cheese.

References

External links
 English Translation of Binyan Ariel
 Binyan Ariel online at HebrewBooks.org
 HeChatzer HaChadasha online at HebrewBooks.org
 Halacha Lema'aseh Rav online at HebrewBooks.org

1717 births
1790 deaths
18th-century Dutch rabbis
18th-century Polish–Lithuanian writers
Chief rabbis of the Netherlands
Dutch people of Polish-Jewish descent
Orthodox rabbis from Galicia (Eastern Europe)
Rabbis from Amsterdam
People from Rzeszów
18th-century rabbis from the Russian Empire